John Leonard Badalamenti (born 1973) is a United States district judge of the United States District Court for the Middle District of Florida.

Biography 

Badalamenti received a Bachelor of Arts, with highest honors, a Master of Arts, and a Juris Doctor, with honors, from the University of Florida. He began his career in the U.S. Attorney General's Honors Program, serving as an attorney-advisor at the Federal Bureau of Prisons. He then clerked for Judges Frank M. Hull and Paul H. Roney of the United States Court of Appeals for the Eleventh Circuit. Badalamenti was also an associate at Carlton Fields, P.A. He served for nearly a decade as an Assistant Federal Public Defender in the Middle District of Florida. He is an Eagle Scout and serves as a volunteer for the Boy Scouts of America.

Badalamenti was counsel of record, authored the petition for writ of certiorari, and presented oral argument in the Supreme Court of the United States for the prevailing petitioner, a fisherman, who was charged under a criminal provision, 18 U.S.C. § 1519, of the Sarbanes-Oxley Act of 2002 for destroying undersized fish to prevent their seizure by federal authorities.Yates v. United States (2015), 135 S. Ct. 1074 (2015).

As a child, Badalamenti lived in the Gravesend Neighborhood of Brooklyn, New York, attending Our Lady of Grace Catholic Academy. He is the nephew of Angelo Badalamenti, an American music composer.

Judicial service

State judicial service 

From 2015 to 2020, Badalamenti served as a Judge of the Florida Second District Court of Appeal after being appointed by Governor Rick Scott.

Notable cases 

In 2020, as part of a three-judge panel, Badalamenti overturned a lower court decision allowing the Florida Department of Children and Families (DCF) to have foster children vaccinated over parental objections.

He concurred without comment in a case where a former same-sex partner requested parental rights to his former partner's biological child.

Federal judicial service 

On December 23, 2019, President Donald Trump announced his intent to nominate Badalamenti to serve as a United States District Judge of the United States District Court for the Middle District of Florida. On February 4, 2020, his nomination was sent to the United States Senate. President Trump nominated Badalamenti to the seat vacated by Judge Elizabeth A. Kovachevich, who assumed senior status on December 14, 2018. A hearing on his nomination before the Senate Judiciary Committee was held on February 12, 2020. On March 12, 2020, his nomination was reported out of committee by a 15–6 vote. On May 21, 2020, the Senate invoked cloture on his nomination by a 65–28 vote. On June 1, 2020, his nomination was confirmed by a 55–22 vote. He received his judicial commission on June 4, 2020.

References

External links 
 
 Appearances at the U.S. Supreme Court from the Oyez Project
 
 

|-

1973 births
Living people
20th-century American lawyers
21st-century American lawyers
21st-century American judges
Federalist Society members
Florida lawyers
Fredric G. Levin College of Law alumni
Judges of the Florida District Courts of Appeal
Judges of the United States District Court for the Middle District of Florida
People from Brooklyn
Public defenders
United States district court judges appointed by Donald Trump
University of Florida alumni